Juan Sebastián Cabal and Treat Huey were the defending champions, but Huey chose not to participate and Cabal chose to compete in Washington instead.

Marcelo Arévalo and Miguel Ángel Reyes-Varela won the title, defeating Taylor Fritz and Thanasi Kokkinakis in the final, 6–4, 6–4.

Seeds

Draw

Draw

References
 Main Draw

Los Cabos Open - Doubles
2018 D